Slovak revolt may refer to a number of revolts in Slovakia:

 Slovak Uprising of 1848–49 (1848–1849)
 Slovak National Uprising (1944)
 Gentle Revolution (1989)